Julius Adolphus De Lagnel (July 24, 1827 – June 3, 1912), was a Confederate States Army officer, who was appointed and confirmed as a brigadier general, during the American Civil War, but who declined the appointment. He was second in command to Brigadier General Josiah Gorgas in the Confederate Ordnance Bureau and at times was an inspector of arsenals. Before the war, he served in the United States Army from March 8, 1847 until May 17, 1861. After the war, he was engaged in Pacific steamship service.

Early life
Julius Adolphus De Lagnel was born on July 24, 1827, in Newark, New Jersey.

De Lagnel was commissioned directly into the U.S. Army in 1847 as a second lieutenant of artillery without having attended the United States Military Academy or a military college. He was promoted to first lieutenant on January 26, 1849. He resigned on May 17, 1861 and moved to his "adopted" state of  Virginia to join the Confederate States Army.

American Civil War
After his resignation from the U.S. Army, Julius A. De Lagnel was appointed a captain of artillery in the Regular Army of the Confederate States. In June 1861, he was assigned as chief of artillery to Brigadier General Robert S. Garnett, commander of the Army of the Northwest. Garnett had been sent to reorganize the Confederate force in the western counties of Virginia after their rout at the Battle of Philippi and to hold the area for the Confederacy. De Lagnel defended the crest of Rich Mountain with a force of four companies and one gun during the Battle of Rich Mountain, July 11, 1861. The main Confederate force did not immediately know that De Lagnel's men were under attack by a superior force commanded by Brigadier General William S. Rosecrans. De Lagnel's force eventually was overwhelmed. After De Lagnel used the sole artillery piece to fight by himself for a period of time, he was wounded and hid in a thicket in an effort to escape from the Union troops. He first escaped from the battlefield to a mountaineer's cabin. After two days of recuperation, he tried to return to Confederate lines disguised as a herder. Union troops detected, identified and captured him near Laurel Hill, Virginia on July 13, 1861. On December 18, 1861, De Lagnel was exchanged for Union Brigadier General James B. Ricketts.

De Lagnel was appointed and confirmed as a Confederate brigadier general to rank from April 12, 1862, but on July 31, 1862, he declined the commission. Historian Stewart Sifakis says the reason for De Lagnel's action is unknown. De Lagnel then served as major of artillery in the 20th Battalion of Virginia Artillery in the Army of Northern Virginia, in June and July 1862.

In July 1862, De Lagnel was appointed lieutenant colonel of ordnance. He served as second in command of the Confederate Ordnance Bureau under Brigadier General Josiah Gorgas. He also commanded the Fayetteville, North Carolina arsenal in July 1862 – 1863. In addition to his ordnance duties, De Lagnel also acted as inspector of arsenals. He was paroled at Greensboro, North Carolina, May 1, 1865.

Aftermath
After the Civil War, De Lagnel was engaged in Pacific steamship service for many years. He died on June 3, 1912 at Washington, D.C. Julius Adolph De Lagnel was buried in the cemetery of St. Paul's Episcopal Church, Alexandria, Virginia.

See also
List of American Civil War generals (Confederate)

Notes

References
 Boatner, Mark Mayo, III. The Civil War Dictionary. New York: McKay, 1988. . First published New York, McKay, 1959.
 Eicher, John H., and David J. Eicher. Civil War High Commands. Stanford, CA: Stanford University Press, 2001. .
 Sifakis, Stewart. Who Was Who in the Civil War. New York: Facts On File, 1988. .
 Warner, Ezra J. Generals in Gray: Lives of the Confederate Commanders. Baton Rouge: Louisiana State University Press, 1959. .
 Wert, Jeffry D. "De Lagnel, Julius Adolph" in Historical Times Illustrated History of the Civil War, edited by Patricia L. Faust. New York: Harper & Row, 1986. . p.  214.

External links

1827 births
1912 deaths
Confederate States Army generals
People of New Jersey in the American Civil War
People of Virginia in the American Civil War
Northern-born Confederates